Rajshahi Collegiate School in Boalia Thana in the center of Rajshahi, a city in northern Bangladesh, is the oldest school in the country.

History

After completing MA in Philosophy from Presidency College, Kolkata in 1895, Khan Bahadur Ahsanullah went on to serve as the first Muslim headmaster of Rajshahi Collegiate School. He was active from 1904 to 1907.

In school history some mentionable additions were made on 1930 which are:
Formation of Boy Scout
Organisation of junior Red Cross
Publication of Annual School Magazine
 in 1936 and Brarbon Shield in 1940.

Buildings and sites

Rajshahi Collegiate School Debating Club
Rajshahi Collegiate School Debating Club was formed in 2008 and got officially recognised by the school authority on 4 April 2011.

Some achievements of Rajshahi Collegiate School Debating Club are:

Business Faculty Debate Forum  Championship-2008 Champion 
Business Faculty Debate Forum  Championship-2009 Champion 
Transparency International Bangladesh Championship-2009 Champion
Rajshahi Sangskritik Shangho Championship- 2009 Champion
Business Faculty Debate Forum Championship-2010 Champion 
Bongobondhu Sangiskritik Jot runner up
Rajshahi Debate Federation DEBATE CHAMPIONSHIP CHAMPION (2011-2012),
Rajshahi Debate Federation-DEBATE CHAMPIONSHIP runner up 2013 
Star Students Debating Club Independence Day Debate Tournament-2014 Champion
Somokal- Jatiya Bigyan Bitarka-2015 district champion
Laboratory School Debating Club Inter School Debate Tournament- 2016 Champion
BFDF-Prothom Alo Jatiya Bitarka Utsob 2019 Runner Up

Headmasters

Sri Sarda Prasad Basu (1836-1844)
Mr. Riz (1844-1852)
Sri Haragobinda Sen (1852-1864)
Sri Jadunath Mukherjee (1864-1870)
Sri Kalinath Dey (1870-1872)
Sri Govinda Chandra Maitra (1872-1873)
Sri Haragobinda Sen (1873-1879)
Sri Kalikumar Das (1879-1891)
Sri Loknath Chakraborty (1891-1892)
Sri Shashi Vushan Sen (1892-1898)
Sri Joy Gopal Dey (1898-1902)
Sri Rajendranath Banerjee (1902-1904)
Khan Bahadur Ahsanullah (1904-1907)
Sri Brajaballav Dutta (1907-1911)
Sri Avaycharan Das (1911-1913)
Sri Chintaharan Chakraborty (1913-1924)
Sri Dhirendranath Sen (1924-1926)
Sri Prasanya Kumar Dev (1926-1931)
Sri Bijay Chandra Sen (1931-1934)
Sri Satish Chandra Sen (1934-1939)
Sri Manimohan Sengupta (1940-1941)
Mohammad Asad Abdul Mahmud (1941-1944)
Mohammed Hidyatul Islam (1944-1946)
Sri Bijay Kumar Bhattacharya (1946-1947)
M. Khalil (1947-1951)
M.A. Latif (1951-1956)
A.K.M Hashem (1956-1958)
Abdul Jobbar Ahmed (1958-1959)
M. Imran Ali (1959-1966)
Mohammed Abdur Razzak (1966-1967)
Mohammed Khalilur Rahman (1967-1972)
Muhammad Izharul Haque (1972-1974)
Rashid Ahmed (1974-1978)
Mohammed Bahadur Ali Sarker (1978-1979)
Mohammed Izabul Haque (1980-1983)
Mohammed Ramzan Ali (1983-1987)
Dr. Muhammad Anowar Hossain (1988)
Mohammed Nawshad Ali (1988-1992)
Mrs. Rawshon Jahan (1992-1998)
Mohammed Entazur Rahman (1998-2000)
Mohammed Abul Kashem (2000-2002)
Mohammed Hafizur Rahman (2002-2004)
Mohammed Abul Kashem (2004-2006)
Mohammed Golam Hossain (2006-2007)
Dr. Nurjahan Begum (2007-to this day)

Notable alumni
 Ritwik Ghatak
 Abney Golam Samad
 Najib Tareque
 Mizanur Rahman Minu
 Fazle Hossain Badsha
 A. H. M. Khairuzzaman Liton
 James (musician) মাহফুজ আনাম খান
 Mrinal Haque
 Sufi Maverick
 Syed Nawab Ali Chowdhury
 First Bangali Architect & freedom fighter Mazharul Islam 
 Sir Jodunath

References

External links
 https://rcs.edu.bd/about
 https://archive.today/20081205080617/http://www.rcspcs.org.bd/index.php

 
High schools in Bangladesh
Buildings and structures in Rajshahi Division
Educational institutions established in 1828
1828 establishments in India
Schools in Rajshahi District
Education in Rajshahi